Michal Spiczko (Polish spelling Michał Śpiczko) is a Polish kabaddi player who currently plays for the Poland national kabaddi team. He has represented his country in the 2016 and 2019 Kabaddi World Cup, and even captained the national team. In 2016 Kabaddi World Cup, Spiczko scored a total number of 48 points for which he secured the 5th position in the top-scoring player list. He has also played for Bengaluru Bulls in the second and third season of the Pro Kabaddi League as defender and became the first European kabaddi player to play in the Pro Kabaddi League.

Spiczko is also the Wide receiver for Lowlanders Białystok of the Liga Futbolu Amerykańskiego. He was a two-time MVP for the Warsaw Eagles in the American game before he turned his attention to kabaddi.

Personal life
Spiczko was born on 15 July 1987 in Poland. He received his Bachelor of Science degree in computer engineering from the Warsaw University of Technology in 2011, he then proceeded to the Warsaw School of Economics where he completed master's degrees in Quantitative Methods in Economics & Information Systems in 2014.

Career

American football 
Warsaw Eagles 2012 – 2018

 Season 2012: PLFA8 Vice-Championship - team captain
 Season 2013: Polish American Football League
 Season 2018: TopLiga Championship - team captain

Lowlanders Białystok 2019 – present

 Season 2019: Liga Futbolu Amerykańskiego

Kabaddi 

 2015: ProKabaddi season 2 for Bengaluru Bulls
 2016: ProKabaddi season 3 for Bengaluru Bulls
 2016: Kabaddi World Cup, Ahmedabad – Poland National Kabaddi Team
 2019: European Kabaddi Championships, Glasgow – Poland National Kabaddi Team

References 

Living people
Kabaddi players
21st-century Polish people
1987 births
Polish players of American football
Warsaw University of Technology alumni
SGH Warsaw School of Economics alumni